Beachlands is an inner western suburb of Geraldton, Western Australia in the local government area of the City of Greater Geraldton.

The suburb was gazetted in 1972.

Geography
Beachlands is located between Geraldton's central business district and the Port of Geraldton, and is bounded by Augustus Street to the north, Fitzgerald Street to the east, the Indian Ocean to the south and Shenton and Crowther Streets to the east.

Demographics

Beachlands residents had a median age of 39, and median incomes were below-average for the region — $361 per week compared with $461 per week. The population of Beachlands was predominantly Australian-born - 76.8% as at the 2006 census - while 6.85% were born in the United Kingdom. 2.48% reported one or more parents of Italian birth. In the 2006 census, 8.03% of residents identified as Indigenous Australians.

The most popular religious affiliations in descending order in the 2006 census were Anglican, no religion, Roman Catholic and Uniting.

Facilities
Beachlands contains a recreation ground, community shopping centre, primary school and a war veterans home. Separation Point Lookout in the suburb's southwest provides views south of Southgate Dunes and overlooking Greys Beach to the west and Mahomets Beach to the southeast.

References

Suburbs of Geraldton